WELX (101.5 FM) is a radio station broadcasting a Top 40 format. Licensed to Isabela, Puerto Rico, the station serves the Puerto Rico area. The station is currently owned by La Equis Broadcasting Corp.

References

External links

ELX
Radio stations established in 1961
Isabela, Puerto Rico
1961 establishments in Puerto Rico